This is an alphabetical list of films produced in Zimbabwe:

A
Accidental Small House (2018)
Across the Grasslands (2016)
Aliens Beyond Boundaries (2015)
Always Take the Weather with You (2004) 
The Assegai (1982)

B
Bag Rabvaruka: Trilogy (2012) 
The Bicycle Thief (2014)
Bitter Pill (2006)
Botso (2017)

C
Chabvondoka (2013)
Chinhoyi 7 (2015)
The Christening (2014)
City of Dreams (2011) 
Le Complot d'Aristote (1996) 
Consequences (1987)
Criminal on the Cross (2010)
Cook Off (2017)

D
Dust and Fortunes (2013)
Death And Other Complications (2018)

E
Elements: Genesis 3-D (2014) 
Everyone's Child (1996)
Eye of the Providence (2012)

F
Far From Yesterday (2015)
Fatima (2015)
Fate (2015)
Flame (1996)

G
The Gentleman (2011)
Gomorinoyera (2014)
Gringo, The Troublemaker (2013)

H
Heartless aka Chi Chi (2011)
Home Sweet Home (2001)

I
I Am the Future (1993) 
I Can Hear Zimbabwe Calling (1980)
I Want a Wedding Dress (2010)
iThemba (2010)

J
Jazz tales (1997)
Jit (1990)
Journey from the Jacarandas (1997)
Jungle Beat: I Want to Break Free

K
Kare Kare Zvako: Mother's Day (2005)
King Solomon's Mine  (1985)
Kiriboni (2013)
The Kiss (2010)
Kushata Kwemoyo (2017)
Kutonga Kwaro Murudo (2021)

L
The Legend of the Sky Kingdom (2004)
Lobola (2010)
The Lost Letter (2017)

M
Marrying the Devil (2014)
Mayaya - The Seed of Corruption (2014)
MaZimba! Til His Wife Do Us Part (2011)
Mr. Bean (2016)
Moonlight Cross (2014)
More Time (1993)
Music for Stress (2011)
Music of the Spirits (1989)
Mind Games (2017)
Mbereko The Movie (2021)

N
Neria (1993) 
Ngoma Buntibe, Music of the Valley Tonga (2000)
No Way Out (2016)

P
Pamvura (2005)
Peretera Maneta (2006)
Playing Warriors (2011)

R
Riches (2001)
Room 203 (2013)
Rent, P. Nkala (2017)

S
Seven (2021)
Sabhuku Vharazipi 2 (2013) 
Shadow Weavers: The End Game (2011)
Shamwari (1980) 
Shungu (2007)
Shungu Dzemoyo (2013)
Sores of Emmanuel (2010)
Spell My Name (2006)
Countries
Still Life (1999)
Something Nice from London (2015)
Stay with Me (2019)
shaina the movie 2020

T
Tamba Wakachenjera (2013)
Tanyaradzwa (2005) 
The Search (2006) 
The Terrific Nights (2007)
That's Me (2001) 
Through the Night (2013)
Tides of Gold (1998)
Twisted (2010)
The Letter (2019)
Tete B (2018)
Tiriparwendo (2008)
Thandie's Diary (2018)
Two Dead Government Officials (2020)

U 
The Unexpected (2014)

V
Varsity: Mirror of Personality (2012)
Village Secrets written by Leonard Chibamu (2019)

W
Whispering Death (1976) 
A World Apart (1988)

Y
Yellow Card (2000) 
You Owe Me (2011)
You never know Valentines's breakfast (2018)

Z
Zambezi (2013)
Zimbabwe 2100 (2014)
The Zimbabwean Marimba of Alport Mhlanga (2000)
''Zvoitwasei by Leonard Chibamu (2014)

References

External links
 Zimbabwe film at the Internet Movie Database
 SM Movies

Zimbabwe
 
Films